The 1928 All-Pacific Coast football team consists of American football players chosen by various organizations for All-Pacific Coast teams for the 1928 college football season. The organizations selecting teams in 1934 included the Associated Press (AP), the Newspaper Enterprise Association, and the United Press (UP).

All-Pacific Coast selections

Quarterback
 Don Williams, USC (NEA-1; UP-1)
 Howard Maple, Oregon State (AP-1)

Halfbacks
 Benny Lom, California (AP-1; NEA-1; UP-1)
 Chuck Carroll, Washington (AP-1; NEA-1; UP-1 [fullback]) (College Football Hall of Fame)

Fullback
 Lloyd Thomas, USC (AP-1; NEA-1; UP-1 [halfback])

Ends
 Phillips, California (AP-1; NEA-1; UP-1)
 Malcolm Franklan, St. Mary's (AP-1; UP-1)
 Lawrence McCaslin, USC (NEA-1)

Tackles
 Steve Bancroft, California (AP-1; NEA-1; UP-1)
 Mel Dressel, Washington State (AP-1; NEA-1; UP-1)

Guards
 Don Robesky, Stanford (AP-1; NEA-1; UP-1)
 Seraphim Post, Stanford (AP-1; NEA-1; UP-1)

Centers
 George Stadelman, Oregon (NEA-1; UP-1)
 Nate Barragar, USC (AP-1)

Key

AP = Associated Press

NEA = Newspaper Enterprise Association

UP = United Press

Bold = Consensus first-team selection by at least two of the AP, NEA and UP

See also
1928 College Football All-America Team

References

All-Pacific Coast Football Team
All-Pacific Coast football teams
All-Pac-12 Conference football teams